Hatiya is an upazila (sub-district) of Noakhali District in Bangladesh's Chittagong Division. It encompasses several islands of Bangladesh, most notably Hatiya Island, Bhasan Char, Nijhum Dwip and Jahazir Char.

History

The Hatiya thana was established with Hatiya Island as its largest and principal island. In 1983, Hatiya Thana was upgraded to an upazila (sub-district) as part of the President of Bangladesh Hussain Muhammad Ershad's decentralisation programme.

Power House
Hatia-Nijhum Island is being illuminated with electricity at a cost of Tk 400 crore.  After 50 years, 30,000 customers are being connected to electricity services in the form of 15 MW power plants.  It is learned that the cost of this project will be 364 crore 36 lakh 15 thousand taka.  Of this, the government will provide 60 crore 8 lakh 31 thousand taka and 13 crore 46 lakh 64 thousand taka with the own funds of the organization.  According to the project officials, 1,100 trucks will be used to transport the goods of the project.  Large lorries weighing 20 tons will also be used.  A floating ferry has been brought in as the only means of communication with the mainland is by river.  Mashiur Rahman, a sub-divisional engineer in charge of residential engineer in Hatia Power Department, said that before independence, the government of Pakistan started Hatia Power Plant with five diesel engines in Hatia.

 But many of these older engines are out of order.  After the present government came to power, the government kept the power plant running with 3 new engines at the request of local MP Ayesha Ferdous.  On the other hand, people of 11 unions of Hatiyar including Nijhum Island are deprived of electricity facilities.  Road Transport and Bridges Minister Obaidul Quader visited Hatia on the initiative of Upazila Awami League early last year.  At that time, he promised to provide 100% electricity to Hatia.  Then Hatia Island, Nijhum Island and Kutubdia Island 100% Reliable and Sustainable Electrification Project.  The project cost is estimated at 364 crore 38 lakh 15 thousand taka.  It was approved at the ECNEC meeting on February 3.  The chief engineer of the project, Farooq Ahmed, told Manabzamin that only the distribution department would be developed through the project approved by the government.

 The contract for production was signed with a company called Desh Energy Limited.  They will initially build a plant with a capacity of 15 MW in Hatiya.

 Hatia Upazila Awami League president Dwipbandhu Mohammad Ali said the people of Hatia had a dream that 100% power would be developed in Hatia.  By setting it up, the people of Hatia will have a great change in their way of life.  Noakhali-6 MP Ayesha Ferdous said she was grateful to the Prime Minister for implementing the demand after repeatedly raising it in Parliament.

Geography

It has 47,970 household units and a total area of 2,100 square kilometres. It is bounded by the Subarnachar Upazila to its north, Ramgati Upazila to its northwest, the Bay of Bengal to the east and south, and Manpura Upazila to its west.

Demographics
At the 2011 Bangladesh census, Hatiya had a population of 442,463. Males constituted 51% of the population and females constituted 49%. The population over age 18 was 125,512. Hatiya had an average literacy rate of 69% (7+ years), against the national average of 72.76%.

Economy
The upazila consists of 52 markets and bazaars. They include Oskhali, Afazia, Tamruddi, Chowmuhani, Sagaria, Jahajmara, Sonadia chowrasta, Char Chenga, Maijdee Bazar and Nalchira Bazar. Most people are employed in agriculture and fishing, and a few professions are government or non-governmental jobs. All banks are run by the government including Krishi Bank, Sonali Bank Limited, and Janata Bank Limited.

The main exports include rice, coconut, betel nut, banana, betel leaf, chili, Hilsa, and other types of fish.

Administration
Hatiya Upazila is divided into one Municipality, the Hatiya Municipality, and 11 Union parishads:
 Burir Char
 Chandnandi
 Char Ishwar
 Char King
 Harni
 Jahajmara
 Nijhum Dwip
 Nolchira
 Sonadiya
 Sukhchar
 Tamaraddi

The union parishads are subdivided into 44 mauzas and 62 villages. Hatiya Upazila is represented as the Noakhali-6 constituency in the Jatiya Sangsad.

Chairmen

Ziaul Haq Taluq Miah

Healthcare
There is one Upazila Health Complex and 10 family planning centres. Notable NGOs operating in this area are Grameeen bank, Dwip Unnoyan Songstha, Brac, Proshika, Heed Bangladesh, CARE, and Caritas. There is also a private diagnostic center which is Hatiya Doctor's Lab (Founder-Dr.Md.Iqbal Ansari - 1995)

Education
Institutions of higher education include Hatiya Dwip Government College and three non-governmental colleges. Some of the schools include:
 Hatiya Darul Uloom Kamil Madrasa
 Sukhchar Azharul Uloom Fazil Madrasa
 Hatiya Rahmania Fazil Madrasa
 Char Renga Islamia Fazil Madrasa
 Char Kailas Hadia Fazil Madrasa
 Tamruddin Ahmadia Fazil Madrasa
 Jahazmara Sirajul Uloom Alia Madrasa
 Chowmuhani Tabarakia Alim Madrasa
 Burir Char Ahmadia Alim Madrasa
 Char King Muhammadia Dakhil Madrasa
 Sonadia Abdul Bari Dakhil Madrasa
 Jahazmara Women's Dakhil Madrasa
 Haji Fazil Ahmad Dakhil Madrasa
 Khaserhat Majidia Dakhil Madrasa
 Nalchira Sayyid Ahmad Dakhil Madrasa
 Burirchar Shaheed Ali Ahmed Memorial High School
 A.M High School
 Oskhali K.S.S. High School
 Tamaraddi high school and college

Facilities
Hatiya Upazila has orphanage facilities across its territory. These include Hatiya Island Orphanage, Darul Aitam Oskhali and the Jahazmara Orphanage.

Notable people
 Amirul Islam Kamal, politician
 Mohammad Ali, former Member of Parliament
 Mohammad Fazlul Azim, industrialist and business magnate
 Muhammad Waliullah, professor

Famous Doctors

Market
Haji sahjhan super market

Haji sahjhan super market

Diagnostic center

See also
 Upazilas of Bangladesh
 Districts of Bangladesh
 Divisions of Bangladesh
 List of islands of Bangladesh

References

Hatiya Upazila